The 2008–09 Asia League Ice Hockey season was the sixth season of Asia League Ice Hockey. Seven teams participated in the league, and the Nippon Paper Cranes won the championship.

Regular season

Playoffs

Pre-Playoffs 
 (4) Nippon Paper Cranes – (5) High1 2–0 (5–2, 8–4)

External links
 Asia League Ice Hockey

Asia League Ice Hockey
Asia League Ice Hockey seasons
Asia